Super Slim Me is a TV documentary presented by British writer and television presenter, Dawn O'Porter. It was broadcast in the UK by BBC Three on 25 February 2007. Porter was on a mission to see what it takes to shrink her UK size 12 figure to the much-touted super skinny Hollywood zero.

Surviving on a diet of just 500 calories a day Porter hunted down the stylists, designers and agencies who are responsible for making skinniness not only appear possible, but the ultimate goal for any dedicated follower of fashion.

The title is based on the American film Super Size Me where the author consumes McDonald's daily for a month.

Content

Experiment
Over the course of an eight-week period, O’Porter challenged herself to go on a crash diet in order to drop from the nation’s average, UK Size 12, to the mysterious, yet idolised, US Size 0. This aspired image has been formed by alarmingly skinny celebrities over the past decade, who are influencing the attitudes that predominately teenage girls have about their bodies. The images of skinny celebrities in the media also convey the message that being thin is a form of acceptance. However, it was also through this experimental crash diet that O’Porter showed her audience both the physical and psychological effects of this lifestyle. 
Throughout the eight-week time period, O’Porter’s every move was documented by a BBC film crew as she transformed herself. During this process, O’Porter met with fashion designers, stylists, modeling agencies, as well as medical experts to find out what it would take to drop her dress size to the infamous US Size 0 (UK Size 4). She soon found out that in order for her to succeed, her calorie intake had to decrease from the recommended 2000 calories a day, to a maximum of 500 calories a day—just a fraction of what the body needs to maintain health. 
Even after finishing just Day One of her experiment, O' Porter’s attitude had changed and she experienced strange obsessive behaviours, as well as mood swings, all as a result of her hunger. By the end of her diet, the psychological effects worsened leading to irritability, insomnia, and lack of energy.

Results
After a gruelling eight weeks of sticking to a strict diet of only 500 calories and constantly working out Dawn was both physically and mentally exhausted. With this crash diet she was losing sleep, feeling depressed every day and feeling constantly weak. Her results ended up in a 69 cm waist ratio and a weight of 59 kilos leaving her total weight loss at 17 pounds. This resulted in her dropping two dress sizes. Her BMI before she started the diet was 22. She ended the eight-week diet with a BMI of 19.

See also
The Truth About Size Zero

References

BBC television documentaries
Documentary films about obesity
Body image in popular culture